Juan Campillo García (16 August 1930 – 28 February 1964) was a professional road bicycle racer between 1953 and 1963.

Career
Campillo competed in five Vuelta a Españas and four Tour de Frances, with his best result being fifth overall in the 1960 Vuelta a España.

Retirement and death
Campillo retired from racing at the end of the 1963 season and used his savings to buy a restaurant in Andorra. On 28 February 1964, the day before its opening, he was crushed by a truck and died aged 33, leaving his six-year-old son an orphan after his mother died giving birth to him.

Career achievements
Source:

Major results

1956
3rd Trofeo Masferrer
1957
6th Trofeo Jaumendreu
1959
1st Trofeo Jaumendreu
1st Stage 1a (TTT), Volta a la Comunitat Valenciana
2nd Spanish National Hill Climb Championship
1960
2nd Vuelta a La Rioja
Vuelta a España
3rd Points classification
5th General classification
5th Trofeo Masferrer
1961
3rd Circuito de Getxo
1962
3rd Grand Prix d'Issoire
5th Tour de Suisse
9th Mountains classification
10th Critérium du Dauphiné Libéré

Grand Tour general classification results timeline

References

1930 births
1964 deaths
Spanish male cyclists
Cyclists from the Region of Murcia